Cheryl Blaylock (also known as Cheryl Blalock; born 1953) is an American puppeteer who performed the title character on Eureeka's Castle from 1989 to 1991. Blaylock is originally from Kalamazoo, Michigan. Before she starred in the title role on Eureeka's Castle, she performed on Sesame Street and in The Muppets Take Manhattan. After Eureeka's Castle, Blaylock played characters on other projects like Oobi, The Adventures of Timmy the Tooth, The Reunion, and Blue's Room.

Filmography
 Sesame Street – Mona Monster, Blue Honker, Forgetful Jones' cousin, Forgetful Jones's mother, Princess Katie, additional Muppets
 The Muppets Take Manhattan – additional Muppets
 Eureeka's Castle – Eureeka
 The Adventures of Timmy the Tooth – Bubbles Gum, Dee
 Muppet Classic Theater – additional Muppets
 Oobi  – Frieda the Foot
 Blue's Room  Frederica "Fred"
 The Planet Matzah Ball – Tina

References

External links
 

American puppeteers
Living people
Sesame Street Muppeteers
People from Kalamazoo, Michigan
1953 births